Spaulding Mountain is a mountain located in Franklin County, Maine. Spaulding Mountain is flanked to the northeast by Sugarloaf Mountain, and to the southeast by Mount Abraham.

The northeast and south sides of Spaulding Mountain drain into Rapid Stream, then into the West Branch of the Carrabassett River, the Kennebec River, and into the Gulf of Maine. The west side of Spaulding drains into the South Branch of the Carrabassett River.

See also 
 List of mountains in Maine

References

Mountains of Franklin County, Maine
Mountains on the Appalachian Trail
New England Four-thousand footers